Galoa is an island of the Kadavu Group of Fiji. It is located in the south of Kadavu and can be reached only by boat.
 

Kadavu Group
Islands of Fiji